The Finnish records in swimming are the fastest ever performances of swimmers from Finland that are recognised and ratified by the Finnish Swimming Federation.

Long course (50 m)

Men

Women

Mixed relay

Short course (25 m)

Men

Women

Mixed relay

Gallery
Some of the current Finnish record holders:

References
General
Finnish Long Course Records 20 September 2022 updated
Finnish Short Course Records 19 December 2022 updated
Specific

External links
 Suomen Uimaliitto web site
 Suomen Uimaliitto record page

Finnish
Records
Swimming
Swimming